Key to the Kuffs is a collaborative album by alternative hip hop artists Jneiro Jarel and MF DOOM under the moniker JJ Doom. It was released on Lex Records on August 20, 2012.

Recording
Jneiro Jarel produced the music in his studio in New Orleans. Although he and DOOM met several times during the recording the bulk of the work was carried out in their respective studios. MF DOOM recorded the vocals for the album in London between December 2010 and April 2012.

The album includes guest vocals by Damon Albarn of Blur and Gorillaz, Beth Gibbons of Portishead, Khujo Goodie of Goodie Mob and Dungeon Family, and Boston Fielder.

Release
Two alternative versions of tracks from the album were released prior to the album. The tracks were the Doom/Thom Yorke/Jonny Greenwood version of "Retarded Fren" and the Dave Sitek remix of "Rhymin' Slang."

Critical reception
At Metacritic, which assigns a weighted average score out of 100 to reviews from mainstream critics, Key to the Kuffs received an average score of 74% based on 26 reviews, indicating "generally favorable reviews".

The Guardian described Key to the Kuffs as a "killer new album with a spectral guest vocal by Beth Gibbons from Portishead." Spin listed a lyric in "Banished" as one of the best rap lines of 2012. Thom Yorke of Radiohead listed "Guv'nor" as his "single of 2012."

In 2017 Pitchfork wrote that "Key to the Kuffs has aged into excellence in the nearly five years since it first came out."

Track listing
Credits are adapted from the album's liner notes.

Personnel

Credits are adapted from the album's liner notes.

Production
 Jneiro Jarel – production
 Metalfingerz Doom – additional skit arrangement 

Additional performers
 Shannon Powell – percussion 
 Damon Albarn – featured vocals 
 Capitol Peoples – outro 
 Roderick Skeaping – violin 
 Beth Gibbons – featured vocals 
 Boston Fielder and Muthawit Orchestra – strings 
 Indigo – additional vocals 
 Khujo Goodie – vocals 

Additional personnel
 Tom Brown – executive production, A&R
 Will Skeaping – A&R
 Who Dat? – mixing 
 Metalfingerz Doom – mixing
 Earl Scioneaux – additional engineering , additional mixing 
 Stephen Sedgwick – additional mixing 
 Drew Brown – additional mixing 
 Matt Colton – mastering

Artwork
 Steve Powers – art
 Klaus Thymann – portrait
 DLT – layout

Charts

References

External links
 

2012 debut albums
Lex Records albums
Albums produced by BadBadNotGood
JJ Doom albums